Scurry-Rosser Independent School District is a school district based in Scurry, Texas (USA).

In addition to Scurry, the district serves the towns of Rosser, Cottonwood, and Grays Prairie in southwestern Kaufman County.

In 2009, the school district was rated "recognized" by the Texas Education Agency.

Schools
Scurry-Rosser Elementary School
Scurry-Rosser Middle School
Scurry-Rosser High School

References

External links

School districts in Kaufman County, Texas